AT-7 may refer to:
 AT-7 Saxhorn, a Soviet wire-guided Anti-tank missile system
 Beechcraft Model 18, aka AT-7 Navigator, a World War II training aircraft
 Hexachlorophene, an organic chemical that was used as an antiseptic and also in agriculture